Dumbledor or dumbledore may refer to:

 Bumblebee (obsolete words dumbledor or dumbledore)
 Albus Dumbledore, a fictional character from J.K. Rowling's Harry Potter series
 Dumbledor, ferocious winged insects in J.R.R. Tolkien's poem "Errantry"